Edison Opto Corporation is a global leading high power LED manufacturer, established in October, 2001 based in Taipei, Taiwan.

Edison Opto Corporation is principally engaged in the research, manufacture and distribution of high power light emitting diodes (LEDs). Edison Opto's major products include high power LED components and modules, applied to lighting equipment, such as portable products lighting, special lighting, building lighting, commercial lighting and outdoor lighting; Datalink, used as digital music and signal transmission interface for acoustic systems, mobile phones and personal computers (PC) mainboards, and opto sensors, applied for digital cameras and personal digital assistants (PDAs), among others. In 2011, Edison Opto created the LDMS service program, which integrates the four essential technologies in LED lighting applications (Thermal Management, Electrical Scheme, Mechanical Refinement and Optical Optimization). In aspect of quality policy, Edison Opto established a photometric testing and product safety laboratory which was certified by UL.

History
 2001.10 Company Established
 2005.08 RoHS certificate passed
 2006.07 Dongguang Edison Opto Established
 2009.06 Yangzhou Edison Opto Established
 2010.09 Edison has been listed in Forbes Asia's 200 Best Companies Under A Billion in 2010.
 2010.Q4 IPO in Taiwan Stock Exchange
 2011.Q1 The starting year of LDMS business
 2011.Q4 Certificate Approved EPA LM80 Approved Lab
 2012.09 Certificate Approved UL Safety Approved Lab

Major Products
LED Lighting devices and modules.
Opto Sensor
Optical SPDIF

See also
 List of companies of Taiwan

References

External links
Edison-Opto

Electronics companies of Taiwan
Light-emitting diode manufacturers
Manufacturing companies established in 2001
Companies based in New Taipei
Taiwanese brands